Captain Harlock and the Queen of a Thousand Years is an animated science fiction television series produced by Harmony Gold USA. The series was created by Carl Macek by combining footage from Leiji Matsumoto’s Captain Harlock and Queen Millennia anime series.

This is the second time the 1978 Captain Harlock series was treated for English language distribution. The first attempt was in 1981 with the lesser known ZIV International, who only released two volumes of two episodes each, the first (episodes 1 and 9) a relatively faithful adaptation, the second (episodes 2 and 3) retooling the approach to a more farcical one. This attempt is often confused with the Harmony Gold production, but the two productions are not related.

The plot of Macek’s creation is extremely different to the plots of Matsumoto’s original works.

Plot

Captain Harlock and the Queen of a Thousand Years takes place in an undisclosed point in the future (the only reference to its date being a single reference to “the eruption of Krakatoa 700 years ago,” placing its approximate date at 2583), after humankind has colonized the distant stars. But prosperity has corrupted the people of Earth, who have become corrupt and decadent.

The Mazone, a race of sentient plants, hatch a plot to seize Earth after their own planet is destroyed. A lone scientist attempts to warn the people of Earth, but at the cost of his reputation and life. The titular Harlock is blamed for the various instances of the Mazones’ attacks upon the Earth, and, despite being an outcast amongst his own people, plans to stop the Mazone and save humanity from the alien threat with aid from Princess Olivia, next in line to throne of Millennia, the Mazones’ supposed allies in the invasion.

Production

After the success of Robotech, Harmony Gold sought to expand their syndicated television production in other animation series originating in Japan. The account according to Carl Macek, producer of Robotech, was that he was subsequently asked what other Japanese animated series he was interested in dubbing, and he expressed an interest in Leiji Matsumoto’s Captain Harlock.

After the rights were obtained, Macek was informed that Harmony Gold had allocated airtime for 65 episodes. Captain Harlock, however, was only 42 episodes long, prompting Harmony Gold to buy another Matsumoto series, Queen Millennia, when they were unable to get another Captain Harlock series to extend the run. It then fell to Macek and his team to combine the two shows into one series.

Unlike Robotech, it was decided to combine the two series simultaneously instead of simply running them one after the other with some “connecting” episodes. At the same time, it was also decided to change the timing of episodes, thus creating a situation where clips from episodes at various points in the original series would appear in a single episode in the American series. This resulted in a wildly different plot from both of the original sources. The Queen Millennia television series also ran 42 episodes, with the result that many episodes were dropped from both series (including the final episodes of the Millennia series, which therefore ended in a cliffhanger) in order to create the 65 American episodes. Additionally, despite the title of the series, the two title characters never appeared together on-screen as the original shows took place in different continuities.

Lost media status

Unlike with Robotech, Harmony Gold was unable to secure a national syndication deal for the series. As such, the series only aired in a handful of markets during the 1986-1987 television season. After the initial airing, the series was pulled from syndication and Harmony Gold ultimately allowed their license for both shows that made up the series to lapse. No home video releases were produced for the series, causing the series to be unavailable for viewing to the general public.

As of 2016, the series remains the only attempt at a release for Queen Millennia in the United States.

Episode list

Genesis
The Inferno
Mystery of the Observatory
Simple Diversions
Origins
Deadly Games
Firefight
Clash of Will
The Knockout Punch
The Hidden Land
Life Sentence
Zero Hour
Revelations
Boot Camp
Battle Stations
Survival Time
Undersea Encounter
Desert Sands
Healing Ways
The Abduction
World for Ransom
Journey Into Darkness
Hot Seat
Knights Without Honor
Firing Line
Royal Treatment
Lone Justice
Passion Play
Cat and Mouse
The Last Laugh
The Raiding Party
The Dark Dimensions
Fire and Brimstone
The White Ship
Command Performance
Glory Days
The Price of Failure
The Days of My Youth
Chain Gang
The Master Builder
Return Engagement
To Catch a Captain
Double Jeopardy
Danger Below
The Deadly Duel
Lightning Strikes Twice
Queen’s Gambit
Mutual Destruction
The Shocking Truth
The Set Up
The Sound of Laughter
Treason Is in the Eye of the Beholder
Date With Destiny
Balance of Power
The Gauntlet
Ray of Hope
Phoenix Rising
Manifest Destiny
Friend or Foe
Walking Wounded
White Water
Coast Guard
Vengeance
Anchors Away
A New Beginning

References

External links
Captain Harlock and the Queen of a Thousand Years at Absolute Anime
Captain Harlock in English: Captain Harlock and the Queen of 1000 Years at The Captain Harlock Archives
 

1980s American animated television series
American children's animated space adventure television series
American children's animated science fiction television series
American television series based on Japanese television series
Captain Harlock
First-run syndicated television programs in the United States
Toei Animation television